Mysia is a locality in north central Victoria, Australia in the Shire of Loddon local government area,  north of the state capital, Melbourne. At the 2006 census, Mysia and the surrounding area had a population of 105. In 2016, this had declined to 43.

Mysia Post Office opened on 6 June 1877 and Mysia Railway Station office opened in 1883. Mysia closed in 1895, but reopened in 1911 replacing Mysia Railway Station office, finally closing in 1992. The War Memorial School was opened on 9 November 1921 by the Earl of Stradbroke, Governor of Victoria. The school was funded by public subscription which raised 500 pounds. The building was restored in 1999, and is currently used as a community hall.

References

Towns in Victoria (Australia)
Shire of Loddon